Frederick Charles Hicks (originally Frederick Hicks Cocks; March 6, 1872 - December 14, 1925) was an American banker and politician who served as a United States representative from New York from 1916 to 1923.

Biography
He was born in Westbury, New York, on March 6, 1872. He attended the public schools, Swarthmore College, and Harvard University. He engaged in the banking business. Frederick C. Hicks' brother, William Willets Cocks, was also a U.S. Representative from New York.

Congress 
He was an unsuccessful candidate for election in 1912 to the Sixty-third Congress. He was elected as a Republican to the Sixty-fourth and to the three succeeding Congresses, holding office from January 4, 1916, to March 3, 1923. His 1914 election was one of the closest in history. He was originally declared the winner by 15 votes, but subsequent lawsuits narrowed the lead to 4 votes and then 10. The lawsuits took more than a year and Hicks wasn't certified the winner until December 21. He was sworn in when Congress reconvened in January 1916, making this one of the longest elections in the history of the House. Though his opponent Lathrop Brown contested the argument, arguing that some precinct captains were drunk and careless, he lost and Hicks retained his seat.

Rep. Hicks was a supporter of women's suffrage. He had been at the bedside of his dying wife prior to the final vote on the Nineteenth Amendment in 1918, but left at her urging to take part in the vote.  He provided the final, crucial vote, and then returned home for her funeral.

He was not a candidate for renomination in 1922 and declined a diplomatic position to Uruguay tendered by President Warren Harding.

Later career 
Hicks was eastern director of the Republican National Committee campaign in 1924, and was appointed by President Calvin Coolidge as a member of the commission to represent the United States at the celebration of the Centennial of the Battle of Aracucho, held at Lima, Peru, during December 1924.

He was appointed Alien Property Custodian on April 10, 1925, and served until his death in Washington, D.C., in 1925. Interment was in Quaker Cemetery, Westbury, Long Island.

Death 
He died on December 14, 1925.

References

External links

1872 births
1925 deaths
Politicians from Nassau County, New York
Swarthmore College alumni
Harvard University alumni
Republican Party members of the United States House of Representatives from New York (state)
People from Westbury, New York